DTB may refer to:

Companies
 Diamond Trust Bank Group of Africa
 Diamond Trust Bank (Uganda)

Media
 DAISY Digital Talking Book, a standard format for publishing e-books hearable and browsable by blind people
 Darker than Black, an anime television series
 Hard copy (also known as a "Dead Tree Book"), a book printed on paper (as opposed to an e-book)

Music
 Donna the Buffalo, an American folk-rock/zydeco band
 The Derek Trucks Band, an American Band
 The Devin Townsend Band, a Canadian musical group

Other uses
 .dtb (device tree blob), in computing, a compiled version of a device tree that is handed to the kernel during the booting process 
 Douglas DT, an American bomber variant called DTB
 David Thomas Broughton, an English singer and guitarist
 Crystallizer, a crystallizer variant called Draft Tube and Baffle
 Silangit International Airport (IATA: DTB)